The Human Rights Protection Party (HRPP) is a Samoan political party. It was founded in 1982 and dominated Samoan party politics for decades thereafter, leading every government until their defeat in 2021.

Va'ai Kolone and  Tofilau Eti Alesana co-founded the party in May 1979 in opposition to the government of Tupuola Efi. It has governed the country since first winning power in 1982, except for a brief period in 1986 and 1987 when internal differences forced it into coalition.

The two founders of the early party, Kolone and Alesana, both became Prime Ministers of Samoa.

Former prime minister Tuila'epa Sailele Malielegaoi has led the party since 1998.

The U.S. State Department's 2010 human-rights report (published on 8 April 2011) stated that the Human Rights Protection Party remained the only officially recognized party in the Legislative Assembly of Samoa (the Fono) as of that date.

After the April 2021 Samoan general election the HRPP refused to yield power to the newly elected government, triggering the 2021 Samoan constitutional crisis. The Court of Appeal ruled against the HRPP on 23 July 2021, allowing the opposition to belatedly take power.

In November 2022 MP's Ale Vena Ale and Tuu'u Anasi'i Leota resigned from the HRPP to become independents, saying they did not want to remain in a party led by a leader guilty of contempt of court.

Principles and policies 
In June 2017, the Samoan Parliament passed a bill to increase support for Christianity in the country's constitution, including a reference to the Trinity. Article 1 of the Samoan Constitution states that “Samoa is a Christian nation founded of God the Father, the Son and the Holy Spirit”. According to The Diplomat, "What Samoa has done is shift references to Christianity into the body of the constitution, giving the text far more potential to be used in legal processes." The preamble to the constitution already described the country as "an independent State based on Christian principles and Samoan custom and traditions."

Electoral performance

Legislative Assembly

References 

Political parties in Samoa
Political parties established in 1979
Human rights in Samoa
1979 establishments in Samoa
Christian political parties